John Neville Gardiner (3 March 1943 – 17 May 2014) was an Australian basketball player. He competed in the men's tournament at the 1964 Summer Olympics.

References

External links
 

1943 births
2014 deaths
Australian men's basketball players
1970 FIBA World Championship players
Olympic basketball players of Australia
Basketball players at the 1964 Summer Olympics
Sportspeople from Newcastle, New South Wales